Leslie G Brown was a Fijian lawn bowls international who competed in the 1950 British Empire Games.

Bowls career
At the 1950 British Empire Games he won the bronze medal in the pairs event with James Poulton.

References

Fijian male bowls players
Bowls players at the 1950 British Empire Games
Commonwealth Games bronze medallists for Fiji
Commonwealth Games medallists in lawn bowls
Possibly living people
Year of birth missing
Medallists at the 1950 British Empire Games